St. Luke Passion is a common English title referring to the passage in the Gospel of Luke describing the suffering and death of Jesus. The title often refers to compositions which have set all or some of the words of these passages to music. 

St. Luke Passion may refer to:
 Lukas-Passion SWV 480 Heinrich Schütz
 St. Luke Passion (Bach), copied by Bach but not by Bach
Lukas-Passion, several settings by Georg Philipp Telemann
Lukas-Passion, five settings among Passions (C. P. E. Bach) 1771, 1775, 1779, 1783, 1787
Lukas-Passion, Rudolf Mauersberger 1947
 St Luke Passion (Penderecki)
St Luke Passion, James MacMillan
St Luke Passion, Eriks Esenvalds